The International Waste Working Group (IWWG) is a registered not-for-profit international waste organisation founded in 2002 to serve as a forum for the scientific and professional community. The IWWG aims to provide an intellectual platform to encourage and support integrated and sustainable waste management and to promote practical scientific development in the field.

Objectives

The objectives of IWWG will be pursued mainly by means of:

Dissemination of Information:
 Collecting, developing and disseminating information on all aspects of solid waste management with particular emphasis on the results of Research & Development;
 Editing and producing the journal Waste Management (published by Elsevier);
 Maintaining an internet web site;

Discussion Forums:

 Running symposia and conferences;
 Organising seminars, workshops and specialist task groups;
 Fostering links with existing organisations;

Education:

 Running training courses and producing training material;
 Publishing textbooks and monographs;
 Developing university courses;

Services:

 Providing technical assistance in co-sponsoring conferences, courses, etc.;
 Supplying consultancy services to institutions, governments, world organisations, etc.;
 Providing advice on the development of guidelines, legislation and waste management policy;

Structure 

The group was conceived as a think-tank, whose work would be based on scientific principles oriented towards practical applications. IWWG is run by a Managing Board, assisted by a Scientific Advisory Panel and supported by Associate Members.
Furthermore, is organised in a smooth, non-bureaucratic manner allowing members to focus on a range of subjects, to react promptly to problems in the field, and to communicate efficiently within the professional community.

Task Groups
Task Groups are international working groups aimed at furthering interdisciplinary research in major areas of environmental engineering.
  
List of the groups:

 Sustainable Landfilling
 Landfill Aeration
 CLEAR (Landfill gas Emissions to the Atmosphere)
 PHOENIX (Management of MSWI Residues)
 Developing Countries
 HumOr (Compost Quality)
 Leaching Tests (Leaching Assessment Methodology and Tools)
 L.a.W. (Legislation and Waste)
 Hydrogen Production
 Landfill Modelling (LMTG)
 Thermal treatments
 Hospital waste
 Industrial waste management
 Prevention of food waste
 WEEE (Waste Electrical & Electronic Equipment)

External links
 International Waste Working Group

2002 establishments in Germany
Non-profit organisations based in Hamburg
Waste organizations